Ni Sichong, Duke of the First Rank (1868–1924) was a Chinese general.  He was one of the handful of Beiyang generals who along with Yang Du and others supported Yuan Shikai's Empire of China during the National Protection War.  He was later part of the Anhui clique until resigning in 1920 due to the disastrous defeat in the Zhili–Anhui War.

Republic of China warlords from Anhui
Politicians from Fuyang
1868 births
1924 deaths
Members of the Anhui clique
Empire of China (1915–1916)